Brokenhearted or Broken Hearted may refer to:

 "Brokenhearted" (Brandy song), 1995
 "Brokenhearted" (Karmin song), 2012
 "Brokenhearted" (Lawson song), 2013
 "Broken Hearted", a 2006 song by Eighteen Visions
 "Broken Hearted", a song by Eric Clapton from Pilgrim
 "The Brokenhearted", a song by Bruce Springsteen from The Promise